This is a list of all seasons played by Millwall Football Club from their early beginnings in the Southern League, to their inaugural season in the English Football League and up to their last completed season. It details their record in the FA Cup, the League Cup and other major competitions entered, as well as managers, top goalscorers and average home attendance for each season.

Millwall were founded in 1885 and for the first nine years of their existence did not compete in league football. They first entered the FA Cup in 1887, turning full-time professional as a club in 1890. They were founding members of the Southern League in 1894, which they competed in for 22 seasons, claiming the title twice in 1895 and 1896. They left to join the Football League in the 1920–21 season. Millwall have played in all four divisions during their 96 consecutive seasons in the league, including the Third Division South, which they won twice, in 1928 and 1938. They were Fourth Division champions in 1962. The 1988–89 season stands as The Lions most successful when Millwall reached the top tier of English football, where they finished 10th in their first ever season in the First Division, after being promoted as champions of the Second Division in 1988. Their lowest league finish is 9th in the founding season of the Fourth Division in 1958–59. Millwall were Second Division champions in the 2000–01 season, when they finished with their highest ever points total of 93.

Millwall have been promoted eleven times (five as champions) and relegated nine times. They reached the 2004 FA Cup Final, losing to Manchester United, but still qualified for the UEFA Europa League the following season, playing in Europe for the first time in their history. They've also reached the FA Cup quarter-finals on eleven occasions, and the semi-finals four times; in 1900, 1903, 1937 and 2013. Millwall have also reached the quarter-finals of the League Cup on three occasions, in 1974, 1977 and 1995. Millwall have reached the Football League play-offs eight times. They were play-off semi-finalists in 1991, 1994, 2000, 2002, finalists in 2009 and 2016, and they were promoted as winners in 2010 and 2017. The Lions won the Football League Group Cup in 1983 and were runners up in the Football League Trophy in 1999. Richard Parker holds the record for most goals scored in a season with 38, which he set in the 1926–27 season.  Millwall's highest average home attendance is 27,373, which they set in the 1938–39 season just before the Second World War broke out.

Seasons

Overall
As of the 2022–23 season, Millwall have spent 96 consecutive seasons in the Football League.

Seasons spent at Level 1 of the football league system: 2
Seasons spent at Level 2 of the football league system: 46
Seasons spent at Level 3 of the football league system: 43
Seasons spent at Level 4 of the football league system: 5

Key

English Football League tier:

Finishing position and cup competitions:

Key to league record
∆ = Tier on Football League pyramid
Pos = Final position
∆ = Final league placing in pyramid
Pld = Matches played
W = Matches won
D = Matches drawn
L = Matches lost
GF = Goals for
GA = Goals against
GD = Goal difference
Pts = Points

Key to divisions
Champ = EFL Championship
Lge 1 = EFL League One
Div 1 = Football League First Division
Div 2 = Football League Second Division
Div 3 = Football League Third Division
Div 3(S) = Football League Third Division South
Div 4 = Football League Fourth Division
SL = Southern Football League Division One

Key to rounds
Grp = Group stage
1Q = Qualifying round 1
2Q = Qualifying round 2
3Q = Qualifying round 3
4Q = Qualifying round 4
5Q = Qualifying round 5
Int = Intermediate round
1R = 1st Round
2R = 2nd Round
3R = 3rd Round
4R = 4th Round
5R = 5th Round
6R = 6th Round
QF = Quarter-finals
SF = Semi-finals
F(S) = Southern area final
RU = Runners-up
W = Winners

Key to managers
(s) = Secretary
(c) = Caretaker manager
  & = denotes joint-managers

Key to Average attendance
Avg. Att. = Average attendance for all home league games only.

See also
List of Millwall F.C. records and statistics
History of Millwall F.C.

Notes

References

Bibliography

Seasons
 
Millwall F.C.